Juanito Victor "Jonvic" Catibayan Remulla Jr. (born October 23, 1967) is a Filipino politician serving as the governor of Cavite since 2019, previously holding the position from 2010 to 2016. He also previously served as the vice governor and as a member of the Cavite Provincial Board. He is a son of former governor Juanito Remulla Sr. and sibling of fellow politicians Gilbert and Jesus Crispin Remulla. 

Remulla entered politics in 1995, when he won as board member of the second district of Cavite. Three years later, in 1998, he was elected as vice governor, a post he held for three terms and in 2010, he became governor. He became a governor again when he defeated former governor Ayong Maliksi in the 2019 elections.

Early life and education 
Remulla was born on October 23, 1967, to a political dynasty in the Remulla family, headed by Juanito "Johnny" Remulla, a long-time Cavite governor, and Ditas Catibayan. He took up his secondary education at the Ateneo de Manila University. In college, he studied at the University of the Philippines Diliman, where he became a member of the Upsilon Sigma Phi fraternity. He graduated with a degree in Philosophy.

Political career

Board Member and Vice Governor (1995–2007)
In 1995, Remulla ran for board member of Cavite from the 2nd district and won. He ran for vice-governor in 1998 and was elected. Three years later, in 2001, he sought reelection with 2nd District Representative Ayong Maliksi, a protégé of his family, as his running mate and their tandem won. The two would win again in the 2004 elections.

As a result, Maliksi was issued a six-month preventive suspension order on August 15, 2005, and he assumed office as acting governor. Maliksi filed a petition and his suspension was lifted on October 24, 2005, when he was granted a preliminary injunction. Remulla would become acting governor again on April 4, 2006, when the Court of Appeals lifted Maliksi's preliminary injunction. Nine months later, on January 10, 2007, Remulla became acting governor for the third time when the Department of the Interior and Local Government (DILG) ordered the six-month preventive suspension order again on Maliksi. In a surprise announcement the same month, he said he would not run as governor against Maliksi in the May 2007 elections. Ombudsman Merceditas Gutierrez lifted the suspension order a month later for lack of merit.

Governor (2010–2016, 2019–present) 

Remulla made a comeback in politics in 2010, when he ran for governor. In the race, he defeated Vice Governor Dencito “Osboy” Campaña, who had the backing of Maliksi.

Under his tenure, Cavite was cited as one of the top-performing provinces in the Philippines by the Department of the Interior and Local Government (DILG). Also, it is the first and only province to be ISO 9001:2008 certified.

In the 2013 elections, Remulla sought a second term as governor, with actor and Cavite Liga ng mga Barangay (League of Barangays) President Jolo Revilla, son of Senator Bong Revilla and 2nd district Representative Lani Mercado, as his running mate. Maliksi challenged him in the race. During the campaign, Remulla accused Maliksi of being involved in the anomalous LRT extension project, where ₱500 million (about US$11.162 million) was allotted for 2,000 housing units, road, lighting and water projects, relocation sites and payments for the residents directly affected by the development. Remulla even threatened to resign if his allegations are proven wrong. And he said Mas mabuti ang mamigay, wag lang magnakaw (It's better to give, not to steal) 
Despite most surveys showing Maliksi would beat him by a wide margin, Remulla went on to win the election by more than 50,000 votes.  Jolo Revilla also won, beating Maliksi’s running mate, Ronald Jay Lacson, son of Senator Panfilo Lacson.

He was named as one of People Asia Magazine's "People of the Year" in 2013, along with 2013 Miss World Megan Young.

In 2014, Remulla was assigned by Vice President Jejomar Binay as his new spokesperson. Remulla was supposed to run for his last term as governor in 2016 but he decided to quit as Binay asked him to become Secretary of the Interior and Local Government should Binay win the presidency. His brother, Jesus Crispin, ran in his stead and later won. However, as of April 29, 2016, Remulla was confirmed to have left Binay's camp in support of presidential candidate Rodrigo Duterte.

Remulla successfully sought a comeback as governor in 2019, defeating former Governor Maliksi for the second time. He sought for re-election 2022 and won, this time with Tagaytay councilor Athena Tolentino, the daughter of 8th district representative Abraham Tolentino, as his running mate. He also supported the campaign of presidential candidate Bongbong Marcos and vice-presidential candidate Sara Duterte.

Personal life
Remulla is married to Agnes Tirona, a physician, with whom he has five children.

Remulla is the team manager of the University of the Philippines Fighting Maroons (Men's Senior Basketball Team) and was instrumental in recruiting and building the team which eventually ended a 32-year finals drought in the UAAP. In game 1 of the 2018 Season 81 Finals against top-ranked Ateneo de Manila University, Remulla was handed a technical foul in violation of the "cooling-off" period when he attempted to approach the game officials prior to the start of the 3rd quarter.

Remulla is also a fan of South Korean entertainment: "Korean dramas and K-pop gave many Filipinos hope and inspiration. Koreans also make the top tourist arrivals in the Philippines. They love our country while we love them for their world-class entertainment. There are no boundaries in pop culture. Learn and take inspiration from what the Koreans have achieved. We can do it."

References

1967 births
Living people
National Unity Party (Philippines) politicians
People from Imus
Governors of Cavite
Members of the Cavite Provincial Board
University of the Philippines Diliman alumni